Patrick Cogan (2 January 1902 – 5 January 1977) was an Irish politician.

He was born on 2 January 1902, the only son and fourth among five children of Hugh Cogan, a farmer, of Moone, County Kildare, and Katherine Cogan (née Nolan) of Tullow, County Carlow. The family lived at Ballykilduff near Tullow. He was educated at Ballyconnell national school, County Wicklow, and joined the Garda Síochána in the mid 1920s, retiring in 1928 to take over the Ballykilduff farm.

A prominent member of the Irish Farmer's Federation and its political wing, the National Agricultural Party, he was unsuccessful as a Farmers' candidate for Wicklow at the 1937 general election but was elected a member of  Carlow County Council from 1937 to 1960. He was elected to Dáil Éireann at the 1938 general election as an independent Teachta Dála (TD) for the Wicklow constituency. 

At the 1943 general election he was elected as a Clann na Talmhan TD for Wicklow and he was re-elected at the 1944 general election. He was deputy leader of the party for a time but left Clann na Talmhan in 1946 owing to his disagreement with its vociferous radical element. At the 1948 and 1951 general elections, he was again elected as an independent TD.

Having joined Fianna Fáil in 1953, he lost his seat at the 1954 general election. He was subsequently elected to the 8th Seanad on the Agricultural Panel as a Fianna Fáil member. He was defeated at the 1957 Seanad election.

References

Sources
Members and Messengers: Carlow's 20th century parliamentarians by John O'Donovan

1902 births
1977 deaths
Independent TDs
Clann na Talmhan TDs
Fine Gael politicians
Fianna Fáil politicians
Members of the 10th Dáil
Members of the 11th Dáil
Members of the 12th Dáil
Members of the 13th Dáil
Members of the 14th Dáil
Members of the 8th Seanad
Politicians from County Wicklow
Irish farmers
Independent members of Seanad Éireann
Garda Síochána officers